Colossendeis acuta is a sea spider that occurs in deep-sea habitats in the Antarctic Pacific. The species shows sexual dimorphism and the eggs are brooded by the male.

References 

Pycnogonids

Animals described in 1993